Louis Barral (1910–1999) was a Monégasque lexicographer.

Lexicographical writings

He was the joint author, with Suzanne Simone, of a French–Monégasque Dictionary (1983). This work complements Louis Frolla's Monégasque–French Dictionary (1963).

The dictionary and other works have contributed to a flourishing of literature in the Monégasque language.

Anthropological activities

Barral was the keeper of the Prehistoric Anthropology Museum of Monaco.

History
In April 1958, Louis Barral discovered the Cavern of Vallonnet along with René Pascal.

See also

 Louis Frolla#Lexicographical writings

External links
Official website for the Prehistoric Anthropology Museum of Monaco

1910 births
1999 deaths
French lexicographers
Monegasque writers
French male non-fiction writers
20th-century French male writers
20th-century lexicographers